Petrophile merrallii is a species of flowering plant in the family Proteaceae and is endemic to southwestern Western Australia. It is an erect shrub with spreading, needle-shaped leaves and oval to spherical heads of hairy yellow flowers.

Description

Taxonomy
Petrophile merrallii was first formally described in 1995 by Donald Bruce Foreman in Flora of Australia from material collected near Southern Cross in 1968. The specific epithet (merrallii) honours Edwin Merrall, a miner who collected plant specimens in Victoria 1887–1888.

Distribution and habitat
This petrophile grows in heath and mallee on sandy-gravelly soils over laterite between Southern Cross, Muntadgin, Pingrup and Lake Grace in the Avon Wheatbelt, Coolgardie and Mallee biogeographic regions of southwestern Western Australia.

Conservation status
Petrophile merrallii is classified as "not threatened" by the Western Australian Government Department of Parks and Wildlife.

References

merrallii
Eudicots of Western Australia
Endemic flora of Western Australia
Plants described in 1995